Saint John harbour can refer to several things related to this east coast Canadian harbour:

 Saint John Harbour - Harbour in the city of Saint John.
 Saint John Harbour (electoral district), a current provincial electoral district
 Saint John Harbour (1974-1995), a former provincial electoral district
 Saint John, New Brunswick harbour cleanup, pollution abatement program
 Saint John Harbour Bridge, a former toll bridge
 Port of Saint John, the federal agency which administers the harbour infrastructure